Gungaloon is a locality in the Fraser Coast Region, Queensland, Australia.

Geography
Doongul Creek, a tributary of the Burrum River, forms most of the northern boundary.

Road infrastructure
The Maryborough–Biggenden Road (State Route 86) runs along the southern boundary.

References

Further reading 

  —includes information on other schools: Braemar, Woocoo, Teebar East, Teebar West, Boompa, Idahlia, Dunmora, Musket Flat, Bowling Green, Aramara North, Aramara, and Gungaloon.

Fraser Coast Region
Localities in Queensland